Golestan Metro Station is a station on Isfahan Metro Line 1. The station opened on 02 November  2016. It is located at Baharestan Boulevard in northern Isfahan. The next station on the west side is Baharestan Station having a similar status as yet unopened. and on the east side Shahid Mofateh Station.

References

Isfahan Metro stations
Railway stations opened in 2016